Umluj is one of the governorates in Tabuk Region, Saudi Arabia.

References 

Umluj island is a Saudi Arabian island located in the Red Sea. Visitors to Umluj can enjoy its beautiful beaches, clear waters, and coral reefs. There are also a number of shipwrecks around the island that make for excellent diving spots. For those interested in history, Umluj was once home to the ancient Kingdom of Lihyan. today, the island is a popular tourist destination and makes for a great place to relax and soak up the sun. 
Populated places in Tabuk Province
Governorates of Saudi Arabia